The 1963 Iowa Hawkeyes football team represented the University of Iowa in the 1963 Big Ten Conference football season. Led by third-year head coach Jerry Burns, the Hawkeyes compiled an overall record of 3–3–2 with a mark of 2–3–1 in conference play, placing eighth in the Big Ten. The team played home games at Iowa Stadium in Iowa City, Iowa. Iowa's game against Notre Dame was canceled on November 23,, following the assassination of John F. Kennedy one day earlier.

Schedule

Roster

Game summaries

Washington State

Washington

Indiana

Wisconsin

Purdue

Ohio State

Minnesota

Michigan

Players in the 1964 NFL Draft

References

Iowa
Iowa Hawkeyes football seasons
Hawkeyes